The following lists events that happened in 1936 in Iceland.

Incumbents
Monarch - Kristján X
Prime Minister – Hermann Jónasson

Events

Births

7 May – Jón Kristinsson, architect
16 June – Árni Njálsson, footballer
19 July – Birgir Ísleifur Gunnarsson, politician. (d. 2019)
16 November – Ólafur Gíslason, footballer
26 December – Bjarni Felixson, footballer

Full date missing
Helgi Valdimarsson, immunologist

Deaths

References

 
1930s in Iceland
Iceland
Iceland
Years of the 20th century in Iceland